The following is an incomplete list of the fictional characters featured in the Mr Mulliner stories of P. G. Wodehouse, in alphabetical order by surname.

 Aurelia Cammarleigh is a handsome girl, being the one Archibald Mulliner falls in love with. ("The Reverent Wooing of Archibald", "Archibald and the Masses", "The Code of the Mulliners")
 Mr Mulliner, a long-winded pub raconteur who tells outrageous stories about his family at the Angler's Rest. (All Mulliner stories except "From a Detective's Notebook".)
 Adrian Mulliner is a nephew of Mr Mulliner, being a private detective. ("The Smile That Wins", "From a Detective's Notebook")
 Alfred Mulliner (twin brother of George) is a nephew of Mr Mulliner, being a stage conjuror. ("George and Alfred")
 Angela Mulliner is a sister-in-law of Mr Mulliner. ("A Slice of Life", Mulliner's Buck-U-Uppo)
 Anselm Mulliner is a younger son of Mr Mulliner's cousin Rupert, being a curate. ("Anselm Gets His Chance")
 Archibald Mulliner is a nephew of Mr Mulliner, being a member of the Drones Club and a sock collector who has a masterful impression of a hen laying an egg. He will have to find more in order to seduce and marry Aurelia Cammarleigh. ("The Reverent Wooing of Archibald", "Archibald and the Masses", "The Code of the Mulliners"; mentioned in "The Fat of the Land")
 The Rev. Augustine Mulliner is a nephew of Mr Mulliner, being a meek curate who eventually rose to married vicar thanks to the Buck-U-Uppo tonic invented by Wilfred Mulliner. (Mulliner's Buck-U-Uppo, "The Bishop's Move", "Gala Night")
 Augustus Mulliner is a nephew of Mr Mulliner, being in love with Hermione Brimble. ("The Right Approach")
 Brancepath Mulliner is a nephew of Mr Mulliner, being an artist in search of a character. ("Buried Treasure")
 Bulstrode Mulliner is a nephew (son of Joseph Mulliner) of Mr Mulliner, being a writer in Hollywood. ("The Castaways")
 Cedric Mulliner is a cousin of Mr Mulliner, being a foppish bachelor of 45 years. ("The Story of Cedric")
 Charlotte Mulliner is a niece of Mr Mulliner, being a poet writing "Vignettes in Verse". ("The Unpleasantness at Bludleigh Court")
 Clarence Mulliner is a cousin of Mr Mulliner, being a photographer. ("The Romance of a Bulb-Squeezer")
 Cyril Mulliner is a nephew of Mr Mulliner, being an interior decorator. (Strychnine in the Soup)
 Egbert Mulliner (1) is a cousin of Mr Mulliner, being an assistant editor. Best Seller)
 Egbert Mulliner (2) is a cousin of Mr Mulliner, being a civil servant. ("Another Christmas Carol")
 Eustace Mulliner is a nephew of Mr Mulliner, being attached to the British Embassy in Switzerland. ("Open House")
 Evangeline Pembury is a niece (by marriage) of Mr Mulliner, being married to Egbert (1). (Best Seller)
 Frederick Mulliner (brother of Dr George) is a nephew of Mr Mulliner. ("Portrait of a Disciplinarian")
 Dr George Mulliner (brother of Frederick) is a nephew of Mr Mulliner, being a doctor. ("Portrait of a Disciplinarian")
 George Mulliner (1) is a nephew of Mr Mulliner, being in love with Susan Blake. ("The Truth About George")
 George Mulliner (2) (twin brother of Alfred) is a nephew of Mr Mulliner, being a writer in Hollywood. ("George and Alfred")
 Ignatius Mulliner is a nephew of Mr Mulliner, being a portrait painter. ("The Man Who Gave Up Smoking")
 Joseph Mulliner is a brother of Mr Mulliner, being the father of Bulstrode. (Mentioned in "The Castaways")
 Lancelot Bassington Mulliner (1) is a nephew of Mr Mulliner, being a poet. ("Came the Dawn")
 Lancelot Mulliner (2) is a son of Mr Mulliner's cousin Edward, being a portrait painter. in Bott St, London. Brought up by his uncle Theodore. ("The Story of Webster", "Cats Will Be Cats")
 Mervyn Mulliner is a son of a Mr Mulliner's cousin, being a chump. ("The Knightly Quest of Mervyn")
 Montrose Mulliner (Mervyn in the U.S. edition) is a distant cousin of Mr Mulliner, being an assistant director. ("Monkey Business")
 Mordred Mulliner is a nephew of Mr Mulliner, being an accidental pyromaniac. ("The Fiery Wooing of Mordred")
 Osbert Mulliner is a nephew of Mr Mulliner, being a rich jade collector. ("The Ordeal of Osbert Mulliner")
 Reginald Mulliner is a nephew (son of late brother) of Mr Mulliner, being an heir. ("Big Business")
 Rupert Mulliner is a cousin of Mr Mulliner, being the father of Anselm. (Mentioned in "Anselm gets his Chance")
 Sacheverall Mulliner is a nephew of Mr Mulliner, being a very timid man. ("The Voice From the Past")
 Theophilus Mulliner is a cousin of Mr Mulliner's nephew Augustus, being Bishop of Bognor. ("The Right Approach")
 Wilfred Mulliner, a brother of Mr Mulliner, is a chemist and is the inventor of various creams, lotions, and tonics, known in the trade as Mulliner's Magic Marvels. Featured mainly in A Slice of Life (short story) he also has a cameo role (Rev. Augustine Mulliner reads a letter from him) in Mulliner's Buck-U-Uppo, where the tonic Buck-U-Uppo is introduced. Wilfred marries Angela Purdue, the ward of Sir Jasper ffinch-ffarrowmere (with two small f's) and they have two sons, Percival who goes to a prep school in Sussex and Ferdinand who attends Eton College.
 Wilhelmina Mulliner is a sister-in-law of Mr Mulliner, being the widow of Sir Sholto Mulliner and the mother of Archibald. ("The Code of the Mulliners")
 William Mulliner is an uncle of Mr Mulliner, being a survivor of the San Francisco earthquake of 1906. ("The Story of William")
 Wilmot Mulliner is a distant relative of Mr Mulliner. ("The Nodder", "The Juice of an Orange")
 Algernon "Algy" Wymondham-Wymondham is a member of the Drones Club, being the one helped his fellow Archibald Mulliner find back the anonymous girls of his dreams, Aurelia Cammarleigh.("The Reverent Wooing of Archibald")

References

 Sources consulted 

 
 

 Endnotes

Lists of literary characters
Lists of minor fictional characters
Mulliner